College Daily is a new media publication whose primary audience is Chinese students studying in North America.

Overview
College Daily was founded in 2014 and expanded from there. The primary audience is overseas Chinese students, particularly those studying in North America.

In August 2019, The New Yorker published a story about College Daily, calling it a "post-truth" publication where Chinese students in the U.S. receive their news.

As of August 2019 the College Daily employed 30 in their Beijing office and 15 at their New York City office.

CollegeDaily has raised a total of $3M in funding over 1 round. This was a Series A round raised on Nov 28, 2017.

CollegeDaily is funded by 3 investors. Tencent Holdings and CMC Capital Group are the most recent investors.

History

CollegeDaily.cn is a Beijing-based news and information platform targeting international Chinese students as well as international college and university faculty and Student Affairs professionals.

Founded in 2014, CollegeDailyCN has grown to cover most of international students studying in North America. Every day, over 500,000 reader get useful information from its multiple platforms. It also has a team of student journalists and editors who provide useful articles and researches to the readers.

See also
Chinese Students and Scholars Association

References

New media
Mass media companies of China
Mass media companies of the United States